Beadwork is the art or craft of attaching beads to one another by stringing them onto a thread or thin wire with a sewing or beading needle or sewing them to cloth. Beads are produced in a diverse range of materials, shapes, and sizes, and vary by the kind of art produced. Most often, beadwork is a form of personal adornment (e.g. jewelry), but it also commonly makes up other artworks.

Beadwork techniques are broadly divided into several categories, including loom and off-loom weaving, stringing, bead embroidery, bead crochet, bead knitting, and bead tatting.

Ancient beading 

The art of creating and utilizing beads is ancient, and ostrich shell beads discovered in Africa can be carbon-dated to 10,000 BC. Faience beads, a type of ceramic created by mixing powdered clays, lime, soda, and silica sand with water until a paste forms, then molding it around a stick or straw and firing until hard, were notably used in ancient Egyptian jewelry from the First Dynasty (beginning in the early Bronze Age) onward. Faience and other ceramic beads with vitrified quartz coatings predate pure glass beads.

Beads and work created with them were found near-ubiquitously across the ancient world, often made of locally available materials. For example, the Athabaskan peoples of Alaska used tusk shells (scaphopod mollusks), which are naturally hollow, as beads and incorporated them into elaborate jewelry.

Beadwork has historically been used for religious purposes, as good luck talismans, for barter and trade, and for ritual exchange.

Modern beading 

Today, beadwork is commonly practiced by jewelers, hobbyists, and contemporary artists; artists known for using beadwork as a medium include Liza Lou, Ran Hwang, Hew Locke, Jeffery Gibson, and Joyce J. Scott.

Some ancient stitches have become especially popular among contemporary artists. The off-loom peyote stitch, for example, is used in Native American Church members' beadwork.

European beadwork 

Beadwork in Europe, much like in Egypt and the Americas, can be traced to the use of bone and shell as adornments amongst early modern humans. As glassmaking increased in popularity through the Middle Ages, glass beads began to appear extensively in bead embroidery, beaded necklaces, and similar wares.

By 1291, artists in Murano, Italy had begun production of intricate glass Murano beads inspired by Venetian glassware. With the advent of lampwork glass, Europeans started producing seed beads for embroidery, crochet, and other, mostly off-loom techniques. Czech seed beads are among the most popular contemporary bead styles.

One technique of European beadwork is beaded "immortal" flowers. The technique's origins, though indistinct, are generally agreed to range at least several centuries back, as far back as at least the 16th if not 14th century. Two mayor styles were developed: French beading, in which the wire only goes through each bead once and the wires are arranged vertically, and Victorian (also called English or Russian) beading, in which the wires go through each bead twice and are arranged horizontally. In the late 19th and early 20th century, the beaded flowers were used to create long lasting funeral wreaths, called  (French for "immortals"). In the mid-20th century, the art was introduced to United States with sales of flower beading kits. In 1960s to 1970s, books by emerging beaded flower designers emerged. In the 1990s and 2000s, there was another revival of interest in the craft, exemplified for example by the funeral wreaths made to commemorate September 11 attacks victims.

Beadwork is a central component of the traditional dress of many European peoples. In Northern Russia, for example, the Kokoshnik headdress typically includes river pearl netting around the forehead in addition to traditional bead embroidery.

Native American beadwork 

Native American beadwork, already established via the use of materials like shells, dendrite, claws, and bone, evolved to incorporate glass beads as Europeans brought them to the Americas beginning in the early 17th century.

Native beadwork today heavily utilizes small glass beads, but artists also continue to use traditionally important materials. Wampum shells, for instance, are ceremonially and politically important to a range of Eastern Woodlands tribes, and are used to depict important events.

Several Native American artists from a wide range of nations are considered to be at the forefront of modern American bead working. These artists include Teri Greeves (Kiowa, known for beaded commentaries on Native voting rights), Marcus Amerman (Choctaw, known for realistic beaded portraits of historical figures and celebrities), and Jamie Okuma (Luiseño-Shoshone-Bannock, known for beaded dolls).

Great Lakes tribes 
Ursuline nuns in the Great Lakes introduced floral patterns to young Indigenous women, who quickly applied them to beadwork. Ojibwe women in the area created ornately decorated shoulder bags known as gashkibidaagan (bandolier bags).

Eastern Woodlands tribes 
Innu, Mi'kmaq, Penobscot, and Haudenosaunee peoples developed, and are known for, beading symmetrical scroll motifs, most often in white beads. Tribes of the Iroqouis Confederacy practice raised beading, where threads are pulled taut to force beads into a bas-relief, which creates a three-dimensional effect.

Southeastern tribes 
Southeastern tribes pioneered a beadwork style that features images with white outlines, a visual reference to the shells and pearls coastal Southeasterners used pre-contact. This style was nearly lost during the Trail of Tears, as many beadworkers died during their forced removal to Indian Territory west of the Mississippi River. Roger Amerman (Choctaw, brother of Marcus Amerman) and Martha Berry (Cherokee) have effectively revived the style, however.

Sierra Madre tribes 
Huichol communities in the Mexican states of Jalisco and Nayarit uniquely attach their beads to objects and surfaces via the use of a resin-beeswax mixture (in lieu of wire or waxed thread).

African beadwork 

Several African nations outside of Egypt have beadwork traditions. Aggry (also spelled aggri or aggrey) beads, a type of decorated glass bead, are used by Ghanaians and other West Africans to make necklaces and bracelets that may be traded for other goods. These beads are often believed to have magical medicinal of fertility powers. In Mauritania, powder-glass Kiffa beads represent a beading tradition that may date as far back as 1200 CE; a group of women have been revitalizing the craft after the last traditional Kiffa artisans died in the 1970s. Cameroonian women are known for crafting wooden sculptures covered in beadwork.

See also 
Glass beadmaking
Murano beads
Bead embroidery
Beadweaving

References 

 Dubin, Lois Sherr (1999). North American Indian Jewelry and Adornment: From Prehistory to the Present. New York: Harry N. Abrams. 
 Dubin, Lois Sherr (2009). The History of Beads: From 100,000 B.C. to the Present. New York: Harry N. Abrams. .
 Beads and beadwork. (1996). In Encyclopedia of north american indians, Houghton Mifflin. Retrieved 27 January 2014, from http://search.credoreference.com/

External links 

 
Handicrafts

Decorative arts
Articles containing video clips